Mateo Drežnjak (born March 8, 1999) is a Croatian professional basketball player for SC Derby of the Prva A Liga and the ABA League. Standing at  1.95 m, he plays at the shooting guard position.

Professional career 
Drežnjak started his professional career in Široki. At the age of 20 he was one of the leaders of the team playing in the Bosnian League and the ABA League Second Division.

In June 2020, Drežnjak moved to Cibona of the Croatian League and the ABA League, signing a four-year contract.

On 7 July 2022, Drežnjak signed a one-year deal with SC Derby of the Prva A Liga and the ABA League.

National team career 

Drežnjak played for the Croatian national basketball team youth selections. He was part of the teams that were ninth at the 2015 FIBA Europe Under-16 Championship and won the gold medal at the 2017 FIBA U18 European Championship Division B.

Drežnjak was part for the Croatia national B team at the 2019 NBA Summer League and 2019 FIBA Stanković Continental Champions' Cup.

Drežnjak debuted for the Croatian A team at the EuroBasket 2022 qualification. In the first two games played against Sweden and Netherlands in  February 2020, he was the top scorer of the team.

In February 2020, FIBA named Drežnjak one of the 10 most promising European talents.

Personal life 
Drežnjak trained karate for six years then turned to basketball following his brother Dario. Mateo's older brother Dario (born 1998) is also a professional basketball player and has played for the Bosnia and herzegovina national basketball team youth selections and the Croatia national B team. Dario and Mateo had played together for Široki.

References

External links 
 Profile at aba-liga.com
 Profile at fiba.com
 Profile at realgm.com

1999 births
Living people
Shooting guards
Croatian men's basketball players
ABA League players
KK Cibona players
HKK Široki players
Basketball players from Mostar
Croats of Bosnia and Herzegovina